The olm (Proteus anguinus) is a species of amphibian. 

Olm may also refer to:
Ocular larva migrans, a form of toxocariasis
 Oil Life Monitor; see Maintenance
 Olm (and Megolm) is a cryptographic algorithm used by Matrix (protocol)
Olm, Luxembourg
OLM, Inc., formerly Oriental Light and Magic, a Japanese animation studio
Hans Werner Olm, German comedy artist
The Olms, a musical group made up of Pete Yorn and J.D. King
Jeff Olm, visual effects editor 
Olympia Regional Airport (IATA code)
An optical light microscope
Ordre Libanais Maronite, the Lebanese Maronite Order, religious order
Congregation of the Sisters of Our Lady of Mercy